The Russian Orthodox Church, also called the Russian Orthodox Church of Saint Megalomartyr Barbara, is a Russian Orthodox Church in Vevey, canton of Vaud, Switzerland. It is listed as a heritage site of national significance.

History
In the 19th century, an important Russian population resided around Lake Geneva, mainly in Geneva (bourgeois families) and Montreux/Vevey (nobility). One of the most prominent Russians in Vevey, Count Schouwaloff, saw his spouse and his only daughter Barbara die. Barbara was married either to Prince Dolgorouki or to Count Orloff, depending on the sources. Schouwaloff wanted to immortalise the memory of his daughter and built an Orthodox church dedicated to the Great Martyr Barbara.

The church was designed in Saint Petersburg by Ippolito Antonovitch Monighetti between 1875 and 1878. It was built by Vaudois architect Samuel Késer and consecrated on November 1, 1878. It became a parish church in 1949 and was listed among the Cultural Property of National Significance in 1977. For a long time, the administration of the church aroused controversy between the churches of Vevey and Geneva.

See also
List of cultural property of national significance in Switzerland: Vaud

References

Bibliography
 

Russian Orthodox church buildings
Russian Orthodox Church Outside of Russia
Churches in Vaud
Churches completed in 1878
1878 establishments in Switzerland
Cultural property of national significance in the canton of Vaud
Eastern Orthodoxy in Switzerland
19th-century architecture in Switzerland